Katrina Mackey (born 1992 in Cork) is a camogie player and scientist. winner of All Ireland Camogie medals in 2009, 2014, 2015 2017 and 2018 All Stars award winner in 2012, 2014, 2016 2017and 2018 She is twin sister of Pamela, who is also on the Cork camogie panel, she won a Munster championship and an All Ireland, coming on as a sub, in her first season on the panel. She was also a member of the Cork Minor squad in 2009. Holds Féile na nGael All-Ireland medals with her club, Douglas, as well as Senior county championship honours and a host of under-age titles, including All-Ireland Colleges with Christ The King, Turner's Cross.

References

External links 
 Official Camogie Website
 Cronin’s championship diary in On The Ball Official Camogie Magazine
 https://web.archive.org/web/20091228032101/http://www.rte.ie/sport/gaa/championship/gaa_fixtures_camogie_oduffycup.html Fixtures and results] for the 2009 O'Duffy Cup
 All-Ireland Senior Camogie Championship: Roll of Honour
 Video highlights of 2009 championship Part One and part two
 Video Highlights of 2009 All Ireland Senior Final
 Report of All Ireland final in Irish Times Independent and Examiner

1992 births
Living people
Cork camogie players
Twin sportspeople
Irish twins
UCC camogie players